Single-photon emission computed tomography (SPECT, or less commonly, SPET) is a nuclear medicine tomographic imaging technique using gamma rays. It is very similar to conventional nuclear medicine planar imaging using a gamma camera (that is, scintigraphy), but is able to provide true 3D information. This information is typically presented as cross-sectional slices through the patient, but can be freely reformatted or manipulated as required.

The technique needs delivery of a gamma-emitting radioisotope (a radionuclide) into the patient, normally through injection into the bloodstream. On occasion, the radioisotope is a simple soluble dissolved ion, such as an  isotope of gallium(III). Most of the time, though, a marker radioisotope is attached to a specific ligand to create a radioligand, whose properties bind it to certain types of tissues. This marriage allows the combination of ligand and radiopharmaceutical to be carried and bound to a place of interest in the body, where the ligand concentration is seen by a gamma camera.

Principles

Instead of just "taking a picture of anatomical structures", a SPECT scan monitors level of biological activity at each place in the 3-D region analyzed. Emissions from the radionuclide indicate amounts of blood flow in the capillaries of the imaged regions.  In the same way that a plain X-ray is a 2-dimensional (2-D) view of a 3-dimensional structure, the image obtained by a gamma camera is a 2-D view of 3-D distribution of a radionuclide.

SPECT imaging is performed by using a gamma camera to acquire multiple 2-D images (also called projections), from multiple angles. A computer is then used to apply a tomographic reconstruction algorithm to the multiple projections, yielding a 3-D data set. This data set may then be manipulated to show thin slices along any chosen axis of the body, similar to those obtained from other tomographic techniques, such as magnetic resonance imaging (MRI), X-ray computed tomography (X-ray CT), and positron emission tomography (PET).

SPECT is similar to PET in its use of radioactive tracer material and detection of gamma rays. In contrast with PET, the tracers used in SPECT emit gamma radiation that is measured directly, whereas PET tracers emit positrons that annihilate with electrons up to a few millimeters away, causing two gamma photons to be emitted in opposite directions. A PET scanner detects these emissions "coincident" in time, which provides more radiation event localization information and, thus, higher spatial resolution images than SPECT (which has about 1 cm resolution). SPECT scans are significantly less expensive than PET scans, in part because they are able to use longer-lived and more easily obtained radioisotopes than PET.

Because SPECT acquisition is very similar to planar gamma camera imaging, the same radiopharmaceuticals may be used. If a patient is examined in another type of nuclear medicine scan, but the images are non-diagnostic, it may be possible to proceed straight to SPECT by moving the patient to a SPECT instrument, or even by simply reconfiguring the camera for SPECT image acquisition while the patient remains on the table.

To acquire SPECT images, the gamma camera is rotated around the patient. Projections are acquired at defined points during the rotation, typically every 3–6 degrees. In most cases, a full 360-degree rotation is used to obtain an optimal reconstruction. The time taken to obtain each projection is also variable, but 15–20 seconds is typical. This gives a total scan time of 15–20 minutes.

Multi-headed gamma cameras can accelerate acquisition. For example, a dual-headed camera can be used with heads spaced 180 degrees apart, allowing two projections to be acquired simultaneously, with each head requiring 180 degrees of rotation. Triple-head cameras with 120-degree spacing are also used.

Cardiac gated acquisitions are possible with SPECT, just as with planar imaging techniques such as multi gated acquisition scan (MUGA). Triggered by electrocardiogram (EKG) to obtain differential information about the heart in various parts of its cycle, gated myocardial SPECT can be used to obtain quantitative information about myocardial perfusion, thickness, and contractility of the myocardium during various parts of the cardiac cycle, and also to allow calculation of left ventricular ejection fraction, stroke volume, and cardiac output.

Application
SPECT can be used to complement any gamma imaging study, where a true 3D representation can be helpful, such as tumor imaging, infection (leukocyte) imaging, thyroid imaging or bone scintigraphy.

Because SPECT permits accurate localisation in 3D space, it can be used to provide information about localised function in internal organs, such as functional cardiac or brain imaging.

Myocardial perfusion imaging

Myocardial perfusion imaging (MPI) is a form of functional cardiac imaging, used for the diagnosis of ischemic heart disease. The underlying principle is that under conditions of stress, diseased myocardium receives less blood flow than normal myocardium. MPI is one of several types of cardiac stress test.

A cardiac specific radiopharmaceutical is administered, e.g., 99mTc-tetrofosmin (Myoview, GE healthcare), 99mTc-sestamibi (Cardiolite, Bristol-Myers Squibb) or Thallium-201 chloride. Following this, the heart rate is raised to induce myocardial stress, either by exercise on a treadmill or pharmacologically with adenosine, dobutamine, or dipyridamole (aminophylline can be used to reverse the effects of dipyridamole).

SPECT imaging performed after stress reveals the distribution of the radiopharmaceutical, and therefore the relative blood flow to the different regions of the myocardium. Diagnosis is made by comparing stress images to a further set of images obtained at rest which are normally acquired prior to the stress images.

MPI has been demonstrated to have an overall accuracy of about 83% (sensitivity: 85%; specificity: 72%) (in a review, not exclusively of SPECT MPI), and is comparable with (or better than) other non-invasive tests for ischemic heart disease.

Functional brain imaging

Usually, the gamma-emitting tracer used in functional brain imaging is Technetium (99mTc) exametazime. 99mTc is a metastable nuclear isomer that emits gamma rays detectable by a gamma camera. Attaching it to exametazime allows it to be taken up by brain tissue in a manner proportional to brain blood flow, in turn allowing cerebral blood flow to be assessed with the nuclear gamma camera.

Because blood flow in the brain is tightly coupled to local brain metabolism and energy use, the 99mTc-exametazime tracer (as well as the similar 99mTc-EC tracer) is used to assess brain metabolism regionally, in an attempt to diagnose and differentiate the different causal pathologies of dementia. Meta-analysis of many reported studies suggests that SPECT with this tracer is about 74% sensitive at diagnosing Alzheimer's disease vs. 81% sensitivity for clinical exam (cognitive testing, etc.). More recent studies have shown the accuracy of SPECT in Alzheimer's diagnosis may be as high as 88%. In meta analysis, SPECT was superior to clinical exam and clinical criteria (91% vs. 70%) in being able to differentiate Alzheimer's disease from vascular dementias. This latter ability relates to SPECT's imaging of local metabolism of the brain, in which the patchy loss of cortical metabolism seen in multiple strokes differs clearly from the more even or "smooth" loss of non-occipital cortical brain function typical of Alzheimer's disease. Another recent review article showed that multi-headed SPECT cameras with quantitative analysis result in an overall sensitivity of 84-89% and an overall specificity of 83-89% in cross sectional studies and sensitivity of 82-96% and specificity of 83-89% for longitudinal studies of dementia.

99mTc-exametazime SPECT scanning competes with fludeoxyglucose (FDG) PET scanning of the brain, which works to assess regional brain glucose metabolism, to provide very similar information about local brain damage from many processes. SPECT is more widely available, because the radioisotope used  is longer-lasting and far less expensive in SPECT, and the gamma scanning equipment is less expensive as well. While 99mTc is extracted from relatively simple technetium-99m generators, which are delivered to hospitals and scanning centers weekly to supply fresh radioisotope, FDG PET relies on FDG, which is made in an expensive medical cyclotron and "hot-lab" (automated chemistry lab for radiopharmaceutical manufacture), and then   delivered immediately to scanning sites because of the natural short 110-minute half-life of Fluorine-18.

Applications in nuclear technology
In the nuclear power sector, the SPECT technique can be applied to image radioisotope distributions in irradiated nuclear fuels. Due to the irradiation of nuclear fuel (e.g. uranium) with neutrons in a nuclear reactor, a wide array of gamma-emitting radionuclides are naturally produced in the fuel, such as fission products (cesium-137, barium-140 and europium-154) and activation products (chromium-51 and cobalt-58). These may be imaged using SPECT in order to verify the presence of fuel rods in a stored fuel assembly for IAEA safeguards purposes, to validate predictions of core simulation codes, or to study the behavior of the nuclear fuel in normal operation,
 or in accident scenarios.

Reconstruction

Reconstructed images typically have resolutions of 64×64 or 128×128 pixels, with the pixel sizes ranging from 3–6 mm. The number of projections acquired is chosen to be approximately equal to the width of the resulting images. In general, the resulting reconstructed images will be of lower resolution, have increased noise than planar images, and be susceptible to artifacts.

Scanning is time-consuming, and it is essential that there is no patient movement during the scan time. Movement can cause significant degradation of the reconstructed images, although movement compensation reconstruction techniques can help with this. A highly uneven distribution of radiopharmaceutical also has the potential to cause artifacts. A very intense area of activity (e.g., the bladder) can cause extensive streaking of the images and obscure neighboring areas of activity. This is a limitation of the filtered back projection reconstruction algorithm. Iterative reconstruction is an alternative algorithm that is growing in importance, as it is less sensitive to artifacts and can also correct for attenuation and depth dependent blurring. Furthermore, iterative algorithms can be made more efficacious using the Superiorization methodology.

Attenuation of the gamma rays within the patient can lead to significant underestimation of activity in deep tissues, compared to superficial tissues. Approximate correction is possible, based on relative position of the activity, and optimal correction is obtained with measured attenuation values. Modern SPECT equipment is available with an integrated X-ray CT scanner. As X-ray CT images are an attenuation map of the tissues, this data can be incorporated into the SPECT reconstruction to correct for attenuation. It also provides a precisely registered CT image, which can provide additional anatomical information.

Scatter of the gamma rays as well as the random nature of gamma rays can also lead to the degradation of quality of SPECT images and cause loss of resolution. Scatter correction and resolution recovery are also applied to improve resolution of SPECT images.

Typical SPECT acquisition protocols

SPECT/CT
In some cases a SPECT gamma scanner may be built to operate with a conventional CT scanner, with coregistration of images. As in PET/CT, this allows location of tumors or tissues which may be seen on SPECT scintigraphy, but are difficult to locate precisely with regard to other anatomical structures. Such scans are most useful for tissues outside the brain, where location of tissues may be far more variable. For example, SPECT/CT may be used in sestamibi parathyroid scan applications, where the technique is useful in locating ectopic parathyroid adenomas which may not be in their usual locations in the thyroid gland.

Quality control
The overall performance of SPECT systems can be performed by quality control tools such as the Jaszczak phantom.

See also

 Daniel Amen, psychiatrist who uses SPECT for diagnoses
Functional neuroimaging
Gamma camera
Magnetic resonance imaging
Neuroimaging
Positron emission tomography
ISAS (Ictal-Interictal SPECT Analysis by SPM)

References

Further reading
 Bruyant, P. P. (2002). "Analytic and iterative reconstruction algorithms in SPECT". Journal of Nuclear Medicine 43(10):1343-1358.
 Elhendy et al., "Dobutamine Stress Myocardial Perfusion Imaging in Coronary Artery Disease", J Nucl Med 2002 43: 1634–1646.
 
 
 Jones / Hogg / Seeram (2013). Practical SPECT/CT in Nuclear Medicine.  .
 Willowson K, Bailey DL, Baldock C, 2008. "Quantitative SPECT reconstruction using CT-derived corrections". Phys. Med. Biol. 53 3099–3112.

External links

Human Health Campus, The official website of the International Atomic Energy Agency dedicated to Professionals in Radiation Medicine. This site is managed by the Division of Human Health, Department of Nuclear Sciences and Applications
National Isotope Development Center Reference information on radioisotopes including those for SPECT; coordination and management of isotope production, availability, and distribution
Isotope Development & Production for Research and Applications (IDPRA) U.S. Department of Energy program for isotope production and production research and development

3D nuclear medical imaging
Radiobiology
Neuroimaging
Medical physics
Articles containing video clips